William George Young (born 27 July 1950) is a Canadian former international soccer player.

References

1950 births
Living people
Association football goalkeepers
Canadian soccer players
Canada men's international soccer players
Soccer players from Vancouver